Beach Samba is a 1967 studio album by Astrud Gilberto, arranged by Eumir Deodato and Don Sebesky.

Beach Samba was included in the book 1001 Albums You Must Hear Before You Die.

Reception

The AllMusic review by Richie Unterberger awarded the album three stars and said that the album was "One of Gilberto's less impressive '60s Verve outings, primarily due to the more pop-oriented song selection...some of the pop choices work well, particularly Tim Hardin's gorgeous 'Misty Roses,'" and praised "Nao Bate O Corocao" saying that it had Gilberto "cutting loose with confident, sassy scats, as she rarely did before or since."

Track listing
 "Stay" (Gayle Caldwell) - 2:41
 "Misty Roses" (Tim Hardin) - 2:36
 "The Face I Love" (Norman Gimbel, Carlos Pingarilho, Marcos Valle) - 2:06
 "A Banda (Parade)" (Chico Buarque, Bob Russell) - 2:07
 "Oba, Oba" (Luiz Bonfá) - 1:59
 "Canoeiro" (Eumir Deodato) - 1:32
 "I Had the Craziest Dream" (Mack Gordon, Harry Warren) - 2:25
 "Bossa Na Praia (Beach Samba)" (Geraldo Cunha, Pery Ribeiro) - 2:48
 "My Foolish Heart" (Ned Washington, Victor Young) - 2:47
 "Dia das Rosas (I Think of You)" (Bonfá, Patti Jacob) - 2:21
 "You Didn't Have to Be So Nice" (Steve Boone, John Sebastian) - 2:41
 "Não Bate O Coração" (Deodato) - 1:35

Personnel

Performance
Astrud Gilberto - vocals
Marcello Gilberto - vocals on "You Didn't Have to Be So Nice"
Eumir Deodato - arranger, conductor
Don Sebesky - arranger, conductor
Ron Carter - double bass
Jule Ruggiro
Seymour Barab - cello
Maurice Bialkin
Maurice Brown
Charles McCracken
George Ricci
Harvey Shapiro
Alan Shulman
Marcos Valle - guitar
Grady Tate - drums
Ray Alonge - french horn
James Buffington
Earl Chapin
Tony Miranda
Toots Thielemans - guitar, harmonica, whistle
Barry Galbraith - guitar
Margaret Ross - harp
George Devens - harpsichord, piano, vibraphone
Benny Aronov - harpsichord, piano
Alan Douglas - percussion

Jack Jennings
Dom Um Romão
Warren Bernhardt - piano
Wayne Andre - trombone
Warren Covington
Urbie Green
Tony Studd
Bernie Glow - trumpet
Jimmy Nottingham
Ernie Royal
Marvin Stamm
John Barber - tuba
Harold Coletta - viola
Richard Dickler
Dave Mankovitz
David Schwartz
Arnold Eidus - violin
Harry Katzman
Leo Kruczek
George Ockner
Gene Orloff
Phil Bodner - woodwind
Bill Hammond
Hubert Laws
Seldon Powell
Stanley Webb

Production
Creed Taylor - producer
Jerry Schatzberg - photography
Chuck Stewart	
Michael Lang - reissue coordination
Suha Gur - reissue mastering
Tom "Curly" Ruff
Aric Lach Morrison - reissue production assistance
Jon Schapiro
Jack Anesh - design
David Krieger
Peter Pullman - editing
Brooks Arthur - engineer
Val Valentin
Rudy Van Gelder

References

Verve Records albums
Astrud Gilberto albums
1967 albums
Portuguese-language albums
Bossa nova albums
Albums produced by Creed Taylor
Albums arranged by Don Sebesky
Albums arranged by Eumir Deodato